Elections to Manchester City Council took place on 1 May 2008. One third of the council was up for election - every ward of the city returned one councillor at this election out of the three councillors a ward in the city has.

Four national political parties - the Conservative Party, Labour, Liberal Democrats and the Green Party - each stood a candidate in every ward in this election. There were candidates from other political parties standing in some of the wards, but there were no independent candidates standing for election this year in the city.

The Labour party retained overall control of the council. The Green party lost their only seat in Hulme to Labour, and the Conservatives failed to gain their first elected councillor, though became the third party on the council due to having one councillor through an earlier defection. The Liberal Democrats, who had suffered two defections since the last election - firstly the aforementioned Tory defection, and another to Labour - gained two councillors (in Miles Platting & Newton Heath and Northenden) but lost one (in Longsight) to Labour.

Voting took place between 7am and 10pm on Thursday 1 May 2008 and counting took place that night at the Town Hall. Overall turnout fell slightly to 27%.

Election result
Changes compared to the 2007 election.

Ward results
Below is a list of the 32 individual wards with the candidates standing in those wards and the number of votes the candidates acquired. The winning candidate per ward is in bold.

Ancoats and Clayton

Ardwick

Baguley

Bradford

Brooklands

Burnage

Charlestown

Cheetham

Chorlton

Chorlton Park

City Centre

Crumpsall

Didsbury East

Didsbury West

Fallowfield

Gorton North

Gorton South

Harpurhey

Higher Blackley

Hulme

Levenshulme

Longsight

Miles Platting and Newton Heath

Moss Side

Moston

Northenden

Old Moat

Rusholme

Sharston

Whalley Range

Withington

Woodhouse Park

By-elections between 2008 and 2010

References

Manchester
2008
2000s in Manchester